Ole Bornedal (born 26 May 1959) is a Danish film director, actor and producer.

Bornedal was born in Nørresundby, Denmark.  He wrote and directed Nattevagten (Nightwatch, 1994), a thriller about a law student who works in a morgue as a night-watchman, and becomes implicated in a series of murders of prostitutes. He also directed an English language remake (Nightwatch) in 1997, starring Ewan McGregor, Nick Nolte and Patricia Arquette. In 2002, he directed I Am Dina. Other Danish films include The Substitute (2007), Just Another Love Story (2007), and Deliver Us from Evil. He directed the English-language film The Possession (2012) and was one of the producers of the horror film Mimic. In 2014 he wrote and directed the epic historical drama 1864, the most expensive Danish TV series in history, chronicling the Second Schleswig War through the story of two brothers.

He is married to the Danish actress, Helle Fagralid, and has three children.

Filmography

References

External links

1959 births
Living people
People from Nørresundby
Danish film directors
Danish male actors
Horror film directors